Tomáš Sklenák (born 2 March 1982) is a Czech handball player for ThSV Eisenach and the Czech national team.

References

1982 births
Living people
Czech male handball players
Sportspeople from Nový Jičín